Marco Konrad (born 18 October 1974) is a German football manager and former footballer who is the current manager of FV Illertissen. He previously played in the Bundesliga with SSV Ulm 1846.

Playing career

Early career
Born in Höchstädt an der Donau, Konrad started his career at the academy of TSV Bissingen before joining TSV 1861 Nördlingen in 1993. He joined FC Gundelfingen in 1996.

SSV Ulm
In 1997, Konrad joined then Regionalliga Süd side SSV Ulm 1846. Two consecutive promotions, however, saw Ulm compete in the Bundesliga for the first in their history in the 1999–2000 season. Konrad made 4 Bundesliga appearances in a season where a 16th-place finish would see them immediately relegated back to the 2. Bundesliga.

SC Pfullendorf
In the summer of 2001, Konrad joined Regionalliga Süd side SC Pfullendorf. Over the course of nine years, he would make over 200 appearances for the club.

Coaching career
Konrad became manager of FV Ravensburg in the summer of 2010. He left Ravensburg at the end of the 2012–13 season. After a spell as assistant manager at SC Pfullendorf, Konrad was appointed as manager in August 2016. He became manager of FV Illertissen in March 2020.

Personal life
Konrad is also a sports teacher.

References

Living people
1974 births
People from Dillingen (district)
Sportspeople from Swabia (Bavaria)
Footballers from Bavaria
German footballers
Association football defenders
TSV 1861 Nördlingen players
FC Gundelfingen players
SSV Ulm 1846 players
SC Pfullendorf players
Bundesliga players
2. Bundesliga players
Regionalliga players
German football managers